Honoré Martens (15 June 1912 – 6 June 1996) was a Belgian footballer. He played in one match for the Belgium national football team in 1938.

References

External links
 

1912 births
1996 deaths
Belgian footballers
Belgium international footballers
Place of birth missing
Association football midfielders